Trifurcula rosmarinella is a moth of the family Nepticulidae. It is commonly found in the Mediterranean region, from the Iberian Peninsula to Cyprus.

The larvae feed on Rosmarinus officinalis. They mine the leaves of their host plant. The mine is transparent, not inflated and not lined with silk interiorly. The larva does not change leaves and the frass is not ejected. Pupation takes place outside of the mine.

External links
bladmineerders.nl
Fauna Europaea

Nepticulidae
Moths of Europe
Moths described in 1914